It Looks Like Snow is the third album by singer–songwriter Phoebe Snow, released in 1976.

Reception

In a retrospective review for Allmusic, critic Joe Viglione called the album "an overpowering collection of pop-jazz-funk-folk that puts this amazing vocalist's talents in a beautiful light... It Looks Like Snow is a major work from a fabulous performer traversing styles and genres with ease and elegance." Robert Christgau wrote of the album; "Snow's gifts as a singer and lyricist are finally channeled. The silly mystical ideas are way down below her overriding good sense; up above we find a fairly strong, direct, and happy woman who is by no means vegetating in her contentment..."

Track listing
All songs written by Phoebe Snow, except where noted.

 "Autobiography (Shine, Shine, Shine)" – 5:15
 "Teach Me Tonight" (Gene De Paul, Sammy Cahn) – 4:30
 "Stand Up on the Rock" – 3:58
 "In My Girlish Days" (Ernest Lawlars) – 4:48
 "Mercy on Those" – 6:06
 "Don't Let Me Down" 	(John Lennon, Paul McCartney) – 5:51
 "Drink Up the Melody (Bite the Dust, Blues)" – 5:51
 "Fat Chance" – 2:56
 "My Faith Is Blind" – 5:54
 "Shakey Ground" (Eddie Hazel, Jeffrey Bowen, Angelo Bond) – 4:18

Personnel 
 Phoebe Snow – lead vocals, backing vocals, guitars
 Reginald "Sonny" Burke – keyboards, string arrangements 
 David Pomeranz – keyboards on "Mercy on Those"
 David Bromberg – guitars 
 Steve Burgh – guitars 
 Ray Parker Jr. – guitars 
 Greg Poree – guitars
 Chuck Domanico – bass
 Reggie McBride – bass 
 James Gadson – drums 
 Ed Greene – drums 
 Harvey Mason – drums
 Andy Narell – steel drums
 Hadley Caliman – horns
 Mel Martin – horns
 Kurt McGettrick – horns, horn arrangements
 Bob Yance – horns
 The Golden Age Jazz Band on "Autobiography (Shine, Shine, Shine)"
 Phil Kearns – backing vocals 
 The Waters Family – backing vocals

Production 
 Producer – David Rubinson 
 Engineers – David Rubinson and Fred Catero
 Mastered by Phil Brown and George Horn at Columbia Studios (San Francisco, CA).
 Photography – Norman Seeff and Phil Kearns

Charts

References

Phoebe Snow albums
1976 albums
Albums produced by Dave Rubinson
Columbia Records albums
Albums recorded at Wally Heider Studios